Richard and Mary Parker are fictional characters appearing in American comic books published by Marvel Comics. They are the parents of Peter Parker, the superhero known as Spider-Man.

Richard and Mary Parker have been adapted to appear in several animated television series and video games. Campbell Scott and Embeth Davidtz portrayed the characters in the films The Amazing Spider-Man (2012) and The Amazing Spider-Man 2 (2014).

Publication history
Richard and Mary Parker were created by Stan Lee and Larry Lieber. For many years prior to The Amazing Spider-Man Annual #5 (published in 1968), there had been no explanation of why Peter Parker was being raised by his aunt and uncle, with his parents only appearing in flashbacks and photographs. That issue finally answered the question: Richard and Mary Parker were murdered by Albert Malik, who was one of Johann Schmidt's successors to the persona of Red Skull.

In The Amazing Spider-Man #365 (August 1992), Spider-Man's 30th anniversary, they reappeared. Two years later, however, in #388 (April 1994), they were revealed to be Life Model Decoys created by the Chameleon and were destroyed.

In the novel Mary Jane, it is said they died in a plane accident while going to Switzerland to turn in some important discovery that Richard made. Peter tries to figure out what the discovery was but fails, as he cannot figure out the things Richard has written on his board.
In July 1997, Untold Tales of Spider-Man #-1, part of Marvel Comics' "Flashback Month" event, written by Roger Stern and drawn by John Romita, Sr., the characters' origins are expanded. Since then, they have rarely been mentioned.

Fictional character biographies
Captain Richard Parker, a decorated soldier of the United States Army Special Forces and younger brother of Ben Parker, was recruited by Nick Fury, the future director of S.H.I.E.L.D., to the C.I.A.

Mary Fitzpatrick was the daughter of O.S.S. agent "Wild Will" Fitzpatrick. She attended the best schools and eventually followed in her father's footsteps, becoming a C.I.A. translator and data analyst.

Richard and Mary met on the job, fell in love, and married. Originally they eloped, later having a more elaborate service, fooling many. Mary became a field agent like Richard, giving them both an easy cover as a married couple. They were assigned to investigate Baroness Adelicia Von Krupp, who had captured an agent of a "friendly power" (who turned out to be Logan, aka Wolverine, then a Canadian operative called "Agent Ten" and who would eventually become an ally of their son Peter who would grow up to become Spider-Man). They rescued Logan from the Baroness and Baron Wolfgang von Strucker. After that mission, they discovered Mary was pregnant; Logan was actually the first person to congratulate the Parkers, commenting later that he never saw an agent as tough as Richard Parker go that white that fast.

Their son, Peter, was often left in the care of Ben and his wife May when Richard and Mary were away on missions. When Richard and Mary ultimately died, Peter was raised by them.

While on a mission to investigate Albert Malik, the third Red Skull, they posed as traitors and double agents to infiltrate his criminal organization in Algeria, ultimately being discovered. Malik had an assassin kill the two by sabotaging their airplane and causing it to crash. They were subsequently declared missing in action/presumed dead, as two burnt bodies were found in the remains.

After death
Richard and Mary's son, Peter, grew up to become Spider-Man. Although he has only vague memories of his parents and no memory of their militaristic history, his aunt and uncle share photographs and happy memories with him, but not their belief that they had been traitors to their country. When Peter discovers this, he travels to Algeria. He finds Malik who sends the Finisher to kill Spider-Man. Spider-Man turns the Finisher's missile against him, killing him, but not before revealing that Richard and Mary were in fact innocent. Spider-Man returns to America with evidence and clears his parents' names.

Richard and Mary Parker were revealed to have a daughter named Teresa Parker.

Life Model Decoys
Years later, the Chameleon, working for Harry Osborn, created Life Model Decoys of Richard and Mary. These LMDs were near-perfect robotic replicas of Peter's dead parents, and managed to convince him that they had in fact been held captive overseas for most of his life. Aunt May retained some suspicions, as there were some things they did not know, such as Richard and Mary's elopement. When Peter discovers that they were fake, he suffers a nervous breakdown. When the decoys were ordered to attack Parker, the Mary duplicate—sharing the original's love for her son—saves him instead. Neither LMD survives the incident. After battling the Chameleon, Spider-Man discovers that Harry Osborn was behind the whole thing, as an effort to avenge his (supposedly) dead father, Norman Osborn. Spider-Man then becomes mentally unhinged over time, until having a near-death experience. May Parker eventually learns the truth about the Life Model Decoys, via learning the truth about Spider-Man. May draws strength by talking to the graves of Mary, Richard, and Ben about Peter's life. The cynical mindset of Harry Osborn and the Chameleon was present in the LMDs, particularly during Maximum Carnage: When Aunt May advises Peter to "listen to your heart", (the pseudo) "Richard" tells a very different lesson:

When Shriek uses her psychic powers to turn the whole town against Spider-Man and the other super-heroes, "Richard" remarks that the "moral, orderly" world he remembered while in prison "was just an illusion! The evil was here—all along — festering beneath the surface!" — inviting a sharp rebuke from Peter's wife, Mary Jane (when exposed as frauds, some of his "parents'" cynicism rubs off on the "son" — with Spider-Man becoming unusually brutal against his enemies and developing a "Spider" alternate personality).

Ambiguities in Marvel documentation
The nature and timing of Richard and Mary Parker's fate are somewhat ambiguous in Spider-Man documentation. For one thing, the very fact that Harry Osborn and the Chameleon were able to fool the State Department, Peter, and (for a time) Aunt May into thinking Richard and Mary had "returned" after 20 years implies that the government was never able to solidly confirm the bodies found in the original plane crash were theirs. This uncertainty was exploited by Harry Osborn and the Chameleon: When explaining how he and Mary "survived", the false Richard Parker asserts that the bodies found were of Russian spies who stayed on the plane while they were forced to jump out. According to Spider-Man: Unmasked, "young Peter was orphaned at an early age when his parents were declared missing in action".

It is also ambiguous how old Peter was when his parents mysteriously disappeared: some accounts have it happening in his infancy; others say he was as old as six years—particularly, The Official Handbook of the Marvel Universe: Spider-Man, 2004. The latter view is supported by Spider-Man's musing, during The Child Within, that he remembers his parents, yet "they were practically strangers to me", as he prepares to fight Green Goblin and Vermin. During the fight, Harry drugs Peter and subsequently discovers that Peter blames himself for his parents' death; Harry conceives the LMD scam to "avenge" his own father shortly after. Another, more comprehensive book on the Marvel Universe (also released in 2004) asserts that Peter's only clear memory of his (real) parents was of the moment they were boarding the fateful plane and he promised them he would be a "good boy" for Aunt May and Uncle Ben. Most Spider-Man stories in the main continuity are vague about Peter's exact age when he was effectively orphaned.

Other versions

1602
In Marvel 1602, Peter Parker's parents are briefly mentioned as having worked with Sir Nicholas Fury, Queen Elizabeth's chief of security.

Bullet Points
In the alternate timeline of Bullet Points, Ben is killed a few months into his relationship with May Parker. Richard and Mary promise to "always be there for her", a vow which was later broken.

House of M
In the alternate reality created by the Scarlet Witch during the House of M storyline, Peter and Gwen Stacy name their son Richard in name of Peter's father.

Marvel Mangaverse
Richard has not appeared or been mentioned in the Marvel Mangaverse continuity, although Mary has. In this version, Mary is named Kiri and is Aunt May's sister and is both the leader of the Spider Clan and a Spider demon, who is known as the Spider Queen. She's been plotting to make her son, Peter, the new leader of the Clan, which he later rejects. Disappointed by his rejection, Mary passes leadership of the Spider Clan to her pupil, Venom, causing Peter to give up his Spider-Man identity.

MC2
In the alternate reality of MC2, Peter names his son Benjamin Richard Parker, with his second name being in honor of his father.

Trouble
The 2003 Epic Comics limited series, Trouble, was marketed as the "true origin" of Spider-Man. In the story, characters named Richard and Mary met while on summer vacation, and Mary's friend, May, rather than Mary herself, was Peter's mother with none of the characters' last names ever revealed.

Ultimate Marvel
In the Ultimate Marvel continuity, Richard "Ray" Parker was a biologist instead of a spy. He and Mary supposedly died in an airplane accident when Peter was six, and Peter still has vague memories of his parents. Before the crash, Richard, along with his friend Eddie Brock Sr., father of Peter's childhood friend Eddie Brock Jr. were working on a cure for terminal malady, in the form of a biological suit that could repair its host body. He recorded a series of tapes addressed to Peter, in which he revealed his fears the suit would be used as a weapon instead of a cure. A tape recorded just before the crash revealed his project had been taken away from him. His project became the basis of Venom. His name and work were known by scientists (including Dr. Curt Connors and the Ultimates Wasp and Giant Man with the former having a written a paper on his work in college), Susan Storm and Reed Richards of the Fantastic Four also knew of him and his work, with the former in particular being a great admirer of it.

In Ultimate Spider-Man #100, Richard Parker seemingly reappeared. He recounted that Bolivar Trask, the man responsible for shutting down the cure project, brought the research staff back together. Richard had second thoughts about working on the project, now knowing the suit he developed would be used as a weapon, and chose not to get on the plane. Mary, however, felt Richard was a fool for turning down this opportunity, and appeared willing to leave her husband (this contradicts her earlier sentiments, that Richard was getting in way over his head). After the crash, Richard was approached by government agent Henry Gyrich, for the purposes of launching his own research project in case S.H.I.E.L.D. Director Nick Fury were ever to go rogue. Gyrich showed Richard a surveillance video proving his son, Peter, was Spider-Man. Afterwards, he revealed himself to May Parker. May, shocked by the possibility that Richard was alive all this time, told him to go away.

Later, in issue #103, Dr. Otto Octavius (who created multiple clones of Spider-Man) reveals that "Richard Parker" was a clone, later confirmed when Susan Storm runs a test on Richard's DNA and finds it identical to Peter's. Apparently, the cloning process severely aged Richard. Though his memories were false, Richard loves Peter like a son and asks the Fantastic Four in particular Sue Storm to look after him before passing away.

In issue #4 of Ultimate Origins, which takes place 15 years before the current Ultimate timeline, Richard is shown to have been hired by the U.S. government and Nick Fury as part of a project to recreate the Super Soldier Serum. At a covert lab in Dover, New Jersey, Richard worked alongside fellow scientists, a young Hank Pym, Franklin Storm, father of Sue and Johnny Storm, and a young Bruce Banner.

One day, while Pym and Banner are testing a possible match to the serum, Richard is just outside the lab being visited by his wife and recently born son, Peter. Having just tested the serum on himself, Banner transforms into the Hulk and goes on a rampage, destroying the complex. Richard and Mary are caught in an explosion and severely injured.

Artist Mark Bagley based the likeness of the Ultimate version of Richard Parker on that of Peter Parker as drawn by John Romita, Sr. and Gil Kane in the late 1960s and early 1970s, feeling he hadn't captured Peter's appearance during his earlier run on The Amazing Spider-Man in the 1990s.

Spider-Geddon
During the "Spider-Geddon" storyline, a version of Richard and Mary Parker were riding an airplane provided to them by Wilson Fisk that is carrying them over the Savage Land until it was rigged to crash by Fisk. The two of them perished in the crash while their son Peter was parachuted out of the airplane just in time where he was taken in by the giant spiders and became the Savage Spider-Man.

In other media

Television
 Richard and Mary Parker appeared in Spider-Man, voiced by uncredited actors. In the episode "Doctor Strange", they appear as an illusion created by Baron Mordo. In the fifth-season episode "Six Forgotten Warriors", it is revealed they were spies investigating a machine called the Doomsday Device created by Red Skull in Russia. After learning from Nick Fury that his parents were traitors, Peter traveled to Russia and cleared their names.
 In The Spectacular Spider-Man, both Peter and Eddie Brock's fathers are mentioned as having been scientists who worked together, with both sets of parents having died in a plane crash just like the Ultimate Marvel versions.
 Richard Parker is briefly mentioned in the Ultimate Spider-Man episode "Great Power".
 Richard and Mary are mentioned by Peter Parker though not by name in the What If...? episode "What If... Zombies?!", as some of the many people he lost, including Uncle Ben, Tony Stark, and Happy Hogan.

Film
 The Parkers are not named and do not appear in the Raimi trilogy, but they are indirectly mentioned in the first Spider-Man film. When Peter meets Norman Osborn during a school field trip, Norman compliments Peter's interest in science by stating that his parents must be proud of him, though Peter clarifies that he lives with his aunt and uncle. Later in the film, when Peter disregards Uncle Ben's advice during a conversation inside their car after arriving at the town library, he reminds him that he understands that he's not Peter's father, which Peter replies that he needs to "stop pretending to be". Although the film doesn't clarify the Parkers' fate, the film's official novelization confirms that they died in a plane crash, much like their comic counterparts.
 Richard and Mary Parker appear in The Amazing Spider-Man with Richard played by Campbell Scott and Mary by Embeth Davidtz. Like in the comics, they are both killed in a plane crash. At the film's beginning, they say goodbye to a 4-year-old Peter as they drop him off at Uncle Ben and Aunt May's. When Peter asked why they were leaving, Richard answers that it was something they had to do and told Peter to be good to Ben and May.
 Scott and Davidtz reprise their roles of Richard and Mary Parker in The Amazing Spider-Man 2, with their characters dying in a plane crash at the beginning of the film, due to an attack by a henchmen as the plane's co-pilot played by Bill Heck. Later, May reveals that she and Ben were visited by government agents a few days after Richard and Mary disappeared and were told that Richard was planning to sell secret weapons to foreign powers. However, while going through his father's things, Peter discovers clues that lead him to a secret lab his father had established in a disused railway station, which includes a video Richard recorded before his death revealing he fled Oscorp to prevent his discoveries from being used for biological weapons. He also reveals Oscorp's genetically-engineered spiders were created using his DNA, thus explaining why Peter is the only successful 'cross-species' to be created; the spiders were specifically encoded to the Parker bloodline and will not fully bond with anyone else. In the extra features there is a scene showing Richard as alive, now visibly aged, and reveals that he has survived the plane crash after the loss of his wife. When Peter angrily refuses to accept the fact that his father is alive, Richard explains to Peter that he had to stay away from him to prevent Oscorp from recovering his research to be used as a weapon, and to make sure that his research would never fall into Oscorp's hands, including protecting his son from harm. As it is an extra scene and not shown in the final cut of the movie, Richard Parker is still considered deceased along with Mary Parker.

Video games
Richard and Mary Parker are featured in the Ultimate Spider-Man video game with Richard voiced by Loren Lester and Mary having no dialogue. Richard and Eddie Brock Sr. (Eddie Brock's father) used to work together and they created the Venom suit, capable of healing its host, as a possible cure for severe illness. However, the suit is very unstable and Richard and Eddie never got to finish work on it, due to signing a contract with Trask Industries that caused them to lose ownership of the suit and both of them dying in a plane crash shortly after. It is revealed in a flashback at the end of the game that the crash was caused by Eddie Sr. trying the unstable Venom suit on board, which caused him to lose control due to its incompatibility and kill the pilot. Mary Parker was also aboard the plane and one of the only three survivors of the crash, but died in the ambulance shortly after, before she could mention what happened.

A collectible referencing Richard and Mary Parker is obtainable in Marvel's Spider-Man (2018), developed by Insomniac Games. One of the in-game Backpack items contains a locket of the couple, who were described by Peter Parker as having been government agents who were killed in action when he was young, although it's suggested their deaths were covered up as part of a fatal plane crash.

Novels
In the "Sinister Six" novel trilogy by Adam-Troy Castro (Gathering of the Sinister Six, Revenge of the Sinister Six, and Secret of the Sinister Six), a man known as the Gentleman — an internationally known criminal mastermind, currently in his late nineties and possessing a strong disdain for the rest of humanity, as well as being the brother of the Red Skull's assassin the Finisher — was revealed to have been partially responsible for Richard and Mary's deaths, having revealed their true identities to the Red Skull, only asking that Peter be spared so that he would be more of a challenge later on in life. The possibility was also raised that Spider-Man had an older sister: the Gentleman's ward, a young woman called Pity, who was capable of climbing walls, possessed a strength level approximately equal to Spider-Man, and could create a "darkness" preventing anyone around her from seeing. At the conclusion of the trilogy, Peter Parker meets Logan, who reveals he worked regularly with the Parkers on joint missions between the American and Canadian secret services; the discovery that Logan was the first person to congratulate Richard after learning that Mary was pregnant prompted Peter to say "Wolverine's practically my Uncle". Logan also clarifies that Pity wasn't his sister; the photographs Peter found of his parents with a little girl were actually part of a long-term cover operation before Peter was born, with both of them still so attached to the memory that Mary kept the pictures and Richard told Logan about it during a joint mission.

References

Characters created by Larry Lieber
Characters created by Stan Lee
Comics characters introduced in 1968
Fictional Central Intelligence Agency personnel
Fictional characters from Queens, New York
Fictional married couples
Fictional murdered people
Fictional secret agents and spies
Fictional special forces personnel
Marvel Comics martial artists
Marvel Comics scientists
S.H.I.E.L.D. agents
Spider-Man characters